Veronica Steele (26 November 1947 – 4 January 2017) was a cheesemaker from Eyeries, West Cork.

Life 
Steele pioneered the homegrown Irish artisan cheese industry with the introduction of Milleens cheese, which achieved national attention when it was picked up by Declan Ryan for use in the Arbutus Lodge, Cork. She was influenced by John Ehle. She started cheese making as a way to preserve excess milk, and develop jobs in rural areas.

Steele suffered from multiple system atrophy later in life and retired in 2003, passing ownership of the Milleens production to her son. In 2016, she was honoured with a "Best of the Decade" Good Food Ireland Award.

References

External links 
 The history of Milleens, milleenscheese.com

1947 births
2017 deaths
Cheesemakers
Irish businesspeople
People from County Cork
Neurological disease deaths in the Republic of Ireland
Deaths from multiple system atrophy
Place of death missing